Berit Elisabet Andersson (11 November 1935 – 14 April 2019), known professionally as Bibi Andersson, was a Swedish actress who was best known for her frequent collaborations with filmmaker Ingmar Bergman.

Early life and career
Andersson was born in Kungsholmen, Stockholm, the daughter of Karin (née Mansion), a social worker, and Josef Andersson, a businessman.

Her first collaboration with Ingmar Bergman came in 1951, when she participated in his production of an advertisement for the detergent Bris. She also worked as an extra on film sets as a teenager, and studied acting at the Terserus Drama School and at the Royal Dramatic Theatre School (1954–1956). She then joined the Royal Dramatic Theatre in Stockholm.

In the 1950s, 1960s, and 1970s, Andersson starred in 10 motion pictures and three television films directed by Bergman. With Ingrid Thulin, Eva Dahlbeck and Barbro Hiort af Ornäs, she shared the Best Actress Prize at the 1958 Cannes Film Festival for the director's Brink of Life, a film set in a maternity ward. The other films included The Seventh Seal, Wild Strawberries, The Magician, The Passion of Anna, The Touch, and Persona.

In 1963, Andersson won the Silver Bear for Best Actress at the 13th Berlin International Film Festival for her performance in Vilgot Sjöman's The Mistress.

From the mid-1960s onwards
Andersson's intense portrayal of a nurse in the film Persona (1966) – in which actress Elizabet Vogler (Liv Ullmann), suffering from a psychosomatic condition, is mostly mute – involved her delivering the majority of the dialogue. For her performance in Persona, she won the award for Best Actress at the 4th Guldbagge Awards. That year, she was seen alongside James Garner and Sidney Poitier in the Western Duel at Diablo. More Bergman collaborations followed, and she worked with John Huston (The Kremlin Letter, 1970) and Robert Altman (Quintet, 1979, with Paul Newman). She was actor Steve McQueen's co-star in his only film  with credit as a producer, a   stage adaptation by Arthur Miller of Henrik Ibsen's An Enemy of the People (1977).

Andersson made her debut in American theatre in 1973 with a production of Erich Maria Remarque's Full Circle. Her most famous American film is I Never Promised You a Rose Garden (1977), which also starred Kathleen Quinlan.

In 1990, Andersson worked as a theatre director in Stockholm, directing several plays at Dramaten. In the late 1980s and early 1990s, she worked primarily in television and as a theatre actress, working with Bergman and others. She was also a supervisor for the Road to Sarajevo, a humanitarian project.

Personal life
In 1996, Andersson published her autobiography, Ett ögonblick (A Moment, or, literally, A Blink of the Eye). She was married first to the director Kjell Grede (1960, divorced) with whom she had a daughter; and secondly to politician and writer Per Ahlmark (1979, divorced). Andersson then married Gabriel Mora Baeza on 29 May 2004. In 2009, she had a stroke; an article published the following year says that from that time on she had been hospitalized and was unable to speak.

She was the younger sister of Swedish film actress Gerd Andersson.

Andersson died on 14 April 2019, aged 83.

Selected filmography
Andersson appeared in the following films:

 Miss Julie (1951) as Dancing girl (uncredited)
 U-Boat 39 (1952) as Girl on the train (uncredited)
 The Beat of Wings in the Night (1953) as Student at Tornelius' party (uncredited)
 Stupid Bom (1953) as Elvira
 Sir Arne's Treasure (1954) as Berghild
 A Night at Glimmingehus (1954) as Maj Månsson
 The Girl in the Rain (1955) as Lilly
 Smiles of a Summer Night (1955)
 Egen ingång (1956) as Karin Johansson
 Last Pair Out (1956) as Kerstin
 The Seventh Seal (1957) as Mia / Mary - Jof's wife
 Mr. Sleeman Is Coming (1957, TV Movie) as Anne-Marie
 Summer Place Wanted (1957) as Mona Dahlström
 Wild Strawberries (1957) as Sara / Hitchhiker
 You Are My Adventure (1958) as Christina Blom
 Brink of Life (1958) as Hjördis Petterson
 Rabies (1958, TV Movie) as Eivor
 The Magician (1958) as Sara Lindqvist
 The Beloved Game (1959) as Lena
 The Wedding Day (1960) as Sylvia Blom
 The Devil's Eye (1960) as Britt-Marie
 Karneval (1961) as Monika
 Square of Violence (1961) as Maria
 The Pleasure Garden (1961) as Anna, Fanny's Daughter
 The Mistress (1962) as The Girl
 Pan (1962) as Edvarda
 All These Women (1964) as Humlan
 Juninatt (1965) as Britt
 Ön (1966) as Marianne
 About Love (1966) as Woman at the aerodrome
 My Sister, My Love (1966) as Charlotte / Sister
 Duel at Diablo (1966) as Ellen Grange
 Persona (1966) as Alma
 Pardon, Are You for or Against? (1966) as Ingrid
 Le viol (1967) as Marianne Séverin
 The Girls (1968) as Liz Lindstrand
  (1968) as Elin Pappila
 Tænk på et tal (1969) as Jane Merrild / Alice Badram
 Blow Hot, Blow Cold (1969) as Margit Lindmark
 The Passion of Anna (1969) as Eva Vergérus / Self
 The Kremlin Letter (1970) as Erika Kosnov
 Story of a Woman (1970) as Karin Ullman
 The Touch (1971) as Karin Vergerus
 Chelovek s drugoy storony (1972) as Britt Stagnelius
  (1972)
 Afskedens time (1973) as Elsa Jacobsen
 Scenes from a Marriage (1974) as Katarina
  (1974) as Blanche Huysman
 It's Raining on Santiago (1975) as Monique Calvé
 Blondie (1976) as Patricia Tauling
 I Never Promised You a Rose Garden (1977) as Dr. Fried
 An Enemy of the People (1978) as Catherine Stockmann
  (1978) as Catherine Dumais
 Quintet (1979) as Ambrosia
  (1979) as Laura
 The Concorde ... Airport '79 (1979) as Francine
 Barnförbjudet (1979) as The Mother
 Marmalade Revolution (1980) as Anna-Berit
 Jag rodnar (1981) as Siv Andersson
 Exposed (1983) as Margaret
 Svarta fåglar (1983) as Simone Cambral
 A Hill on the Dark Side of the Moon (1983) as Ann-Charlotte Leffler
 Sista leken (1984) as Viktor's Wife
 Wallenberg: A Hero's Story (1985, TV Movie) as Maria 'Maj' Wallenberg
 Huomenna (1986) as Singer
 Poor Butterfly (1986) as Gertrud
 Los dueños del silencio (1987) as Marie-Louise Wallén, Ambassador
 Babette's Feast (1987) as Swedish Lady-in-Waiting
 Creditors (1988) as Tekla
 Una estación de paso (1992) as Lise
 The Butterfly's Dream (1994) as La madre
 Dreamplay (1994) as Victoria
 Det blir aldrig som man tänkt sig (2000) as Solveig Olsson
 Anna (2000) as Annas Mor
 Elina: As If I Wasn't There (2002) as Tora Holm
 The Lost Prince (2003, TV Movie) as Queen Alexandra
 När mörkret faller (2006) as Svärmodern
 Arn – The Knight Templar (2007) as Moder Rikissa
 Arn – The Kingdom at Road's End (2008) as Moder Rikissa
 The Frost (2009) as The Widow Rat

Awards and honours
2006: Ibsen Centennial Commemoration Award
73767 Bibiandersson, a minor planet discovered by Eric Walter Elst, is named after her.

References

Further reading

External links

1935 births
2019 deaths
20th-century Swedish actresses
21st-century Swedish actresses
Swedish film actresses
Swedish stage actresses
Swedish television actresses
Actresses from Stockholm
Best Actress Guldbagge Award winners
Best Supporting Actress Guldbagge Award winners
Cannes Film Festival Award for Best Actress winners
Eugene O'Neill Award winners
Litteris et Artibus recipients
Silver Bear for Best Actress winners
Spouses of politicians
Deaths from cerebrovascular disease